is an action role-playing game developed by EasyGameStation for Windows. It was originally released in Japan in 2006. The game was localized into non-Japanese languages twice; first by DHM Interactive in January of 2010 at physical retail in a release that did not leave continental Europe  and an English version was released World Wide on Steam and GamersGate on July 29, 2011.

Gameplay

Plot

Reception

The game sold over 50,000 units. Overall the game was given mediocre reviews according to IGN, Metacritic, and Gamerankings.

See also 
Recettear: An Item Shop's Tale

References

External links 
 
  
Chantelise at Hardcore Gaming 101

2006 video games
Action role-playing video games
Doujin video games
Fantasy video games
Video games developed in Japan
Video games featuring female protagonists
Windows games
Windows-only games